Austrocochlea zeus, common name the dory austrocochlea, is a species of sea snail, a marine gastropod mollusk in the family Trochidae, the top snails.

Description
The height of the shell attains 16 mm, its diameter 19 mm. The thick, obtuse shell is imperforate. The apex is short, papillose and yellowish. The  
suture is impressed. The 4 to 5  whorls are moderately convex. They are obliquely striate and spirally sulcate. The body whorl is  ample, rounded, obsoletely angulated above and marginated at the suture. It is white, with radiating flexuous red lines. The base of the shell is convex. The aperture is circular. The columella is subdentate at its base. The thick columellar calluses whitish-green. The outer lip is thick.

Distribution
This species is endemic to Australia and occurs off Western Australia.

References

 Fischer, P. 1878. Genres Calcar, Trochus, Xenophora, Tectarius et Risella. pp. 241–336 in Keiner, L.C. (ed.). Spécies general et iconographie des coquilles vivantes. Paris : J.B. Baillière Vol. 11
 Hedley, C. 1916. A preliminary index of the Mollusca of Western Australia. Journal and Proceedings of the Royal Society of Western Australia 1: 1-77
 Cotton, B.C. & Godfrey, F.K. 1934. South Australian Shells. Part 13. South Australian Naturalist 1 16: 1-6

External links
 To Encyclopedia of Life
 To World Register of Marine Species

zeus
Gastropods of Australia
Gastropods described in 1874